In chemistry, diamondoids are variants of the carbon cage molecule known as adamantane (C10H16), the smallest unit cage structure of the diamond crystal lattice. Diamondoids also known as nanodiamonds or condensed adamantanes may include one or more cages (adamantane, diamantane, triamantane, and higher polymantanes) as well as numerous isomeric and structural variants of adamantanes and polymantanes. These diamondoids occur naturally in petroleum deposits and have been extracted and purified into large pure crystals of polymantane molecules having more than a dozen adamantane cages per molecule. These species are of interest as molecular approximations of the diamond cubic framework, terminated with C−H bonds.

Examples
 

Examples include:
 Adamantane (C10H16)
 Iceane (C12H18)
 BC-8 (C14H20)
 Diamantane (C14H20) also diadamantane, two face-fused cages
 Triamantane (C18H24), also triadamantane. Diamantane has four identical faces available for anchoring a new C4H4 unit.
 Isotetramantane (C22H28). Triamantane has eight faces on to which a new C4H4 unit can be added resulting in four isomers. One of these isomers displays a helical twist and is therefore prochiral. The P and M enantiomers have been separated.
 Pentamantane has nine isomers with chemical formula C26H32 and one more pentamantane exists with chemical formula C25H30
 Cyclohexamantane (C26H30)
 Super-adamantane (C30H36)

One tetramantane isomer is the largest ever diamondoid prepared by organic synthesis using a keto-carbenoid reaction to attach cyclopentane rings. Longer diamondoids have been formed from diamantane dicarboxylic acid. The first-ever isolation of a wide range of diamondoids from petroleum took place in the following steps: a vacuum distillation above 345 °C, the equivalent atmospheric boiling point, then pyrolysis at 400 to 450 °C in order to remove all non-diamondoid compounds (diamondoids are thermodynamically very stable and will survive this pyrolysis) and then a series of high-performance liquid chromatography separation techniques.

In one study a tetramantane compound is fitted with thiol groups at the bridgehead positions. This allows their anchorage to a gold surface and formation of self-assembled monolayers (diamond-on-gold). Additionally, functionalized diamondoids (adamantanes) have been proposed as molecular building blocks for self-assembled molecular crystals.

Organic chemistry of diamondoids even extends to pentamantane. The medial position (base) in this molecule (the isomer [1(2,3)4]pentamantane) is calculated to yield a more favorable carbocation than the apical position (top) and simple bromination of pentamantane 1 with bromine exclusively gives the medial bromo derivative 2 which on hydrolysis in water and DMF forms the alcohol 3.

In contrast nitroxylation of 1 with nitric acid gives the apical nitrate 4 as an intermediate which is hydrolysed to the apical alcohol 5 due to the higher steric demand of the active electrophilic  species. This alcohol can react with thionyl bromide to the bromide 6 and in a series of steps (not shown) to the corresponding thiol. Pentamantane can also react with tetrabromomethane and tetra-n-butylammonium bromide (TBABr) in a free radical reaction to the bromide but without selectivity.

Origin and occurrence 

Diamondoids are found in mature high-temperature petroleum fluids (volatile oils, condensates and wet gases). These fluids can have up to a spoonful of diamondoids per US gallon (3.78 liters). A review by Mello and Moldowan in 2005 showed that although the carbon in diamonds is not biological in origin, the diamondoids found in petroleum are composed of carbon from biological sources. This was determined by comparing the ratios of carbon isotopes present.

Optical and electronic properties 

The optical absorption for all diamondoids lies deep in the ultraviolet spectral region with optical band gaps around 6 electronvolts and higher. The spectrum of each diamondoid is found to reflect its individual size, shape and symmetry. Due to their well-defined size and structure diamondoids also serve as a model system for electronic structure calculations.

Many of the optoelectronic properties of diamondoids are determined by the difference in the nature of the highest occupied and lowest unoccupied molecular orbitals: the former is a bulk state, whereas the latter is a surface state. As a result, the energy of the lowest unoccupied molecular orbital is roughly independent of the size of the diamondoid.

Diamondoids have been found to exhibit a negative electron affinity, making them potentially useful in electron-emission devices.

See also
 Other diamond-like compounds: Boron nitride
 Abiogenic petroleum origin

References

External links
 Cluster and Nanocrystal Research Group, Technische Universität Berlin
 Molecular Diamond Technologies, Chevron Texaco
 Nanotechnology and the arrival of the Diamond Age
 Laser Raman Spectroscopy and Modelling of Diamondoids
 Electronic and Optical Properties of Diamondoids (free download)
 Diamondoid Molecules: With Applications in Biomedicine, Materials Science, Nanotechnology & Petroleum Science
 Diamondoid-functionalized gold nanogaps as sensors for natural, mutated, and epigenetically modified DNA nucleotides

Carbon nanoparticles
Adamantane-like molecules